Pieris brassicoides is a butterfly in the family Pieridae. It is found in Ethiopia and Tanzania. The habitat consists of montane areas.

The larvae feed on Tropaeolum majus and Brassica napus.

Pieris rapae is one of the closest relatives of this family.

Subspecies
Pieris brassicoides brassicoides (highlands Ethiopia above 2,000 meters)
Pieris brassicoides marghanita Hemming, 1941 (northern Tanzania)

References

Seitz, A. Die Gross-Schmetterlinge der Erde 13: Die Afrikanischen Tagfalter. Plate XIII 12

Butterflies described in 1849
brassicoides